Sadiq Mousa (born 20 October 1959) is a former Iraqi football forward. He competed in the men's tournament at the 1984 Summer Olympics. Mousa played for Iraq between 1984 and 1987.

References

1959 births
Living people
Iraqi footballers
Iraq international footballers
Olympic footballers of Iraq
Footballers at the 1984 Summer Olympics
Place of birth missing (living people)
Association football forwards
Association football midfielders